AIFD may stand for:

American Institute of Floral Designers, American non-profit organization dedicated to recognizing and promoting the art of floral design as a professional career
American Islamic Forum for Democracy, American Muslim think tank